Zarnitsa ("heat lightning") may refer to:

Zarnitsa mine, diamond mine, Russia
Zarnitsa game, Young Pioneer war game, Soviet Union
Zarnitsa, Uragan-class guard ship
Zarnitsa radar, developed by the Marine Scientific Research Institute of radioelectronics